The dark dagger (Acronicta tridens) is a moth of the family Noctuidae. The species was first described by Michael Denis and Ignaz Schiffermüller in 1775. It is distributed throughout Europe (from southern Fennoscandia to the Balkans and Italy), Turkey, the Near East, the European part of Russia, southern Siberia, the Ural, the Russian Far East (Primorye, southern Khabarovsk, southern Amur region and Sakhalin), the Korean Peninsula, China and Japan (Hokkaido).

This species has grey forewings marked with bold black "daggers". The hindwings of the males are white, those of the females dirty grey. The wingspan is 35–43 mm. Adults of this species are extremely similar to the grey dagger (Acronicta psi). Despite the common name, the dark dagger is usually the paler of the two species and the white hindwings of the male are usually diagnostic. However, the only reliable way of distinguishing adults of the two species is by examination of the genitalia. See See Townsend et al.
The larvae, however, are very different (see below). This species flies at night in June and July  and is attracted to light and sometimes to sugar.

The larva is black, marked with red and white stripes, without the bold yellow markings and prominent horn of the larva of the grey dagger. It feeds on a variety of plants (see list below). This species overwinters as a pupa, sometimes spending two winters in this form.

  The flight season refers to the British Isles. This may vary in other parts of the range.

Recorded food plants
Betula - birch
Caragana
Crataegus - hawthorn
Malus - apple
Prunus
Pyrus - pear
Rhamnus - buckthorn
Rosa - rose
Salix - willow
Sorbus - rowan

References

External links

Fauna Europaea
"08776 Acronicta tridens ([Denis & Schiffermüller], 1775) - Dreizack-Pfeileule". Lepiforum e. V.

Acronicta
Moths described in 1775
Moths of Europe
Moths of Asia
Taxa named by Michael Denis
Taxa named by Ignaz Schiffermüller